Elizabeth Thynne, Marchioness of Bath (27 July 1735 – 12 December 1825),  Lady Elizabeth Bentinck, was a British courtier and the wife of Thomas Thynne, 1st Marquess of Bath. From 1761 to 1793, she was a Lady of the Bedchamber to Charlotte of Mecklenburg-Strelitz, queen consort of King George III of the United Kingdom. In 1793, as Dowager Marchioness, she became Mistress of the Robes and held that position until the queen's death in 1818.

Life and family
She was born at Welbeck Abbey, the daughter of William Bentinck, 2nd Duke of Portland, and his wife, Margaret.

She married Thomas Thynne, then the 3rd Viscount Weymouth, on 22 March 1759 at St. Margaret's Church, Westminster, becoming Viscountess Weymouth. The couple had three sons, including Thomas Thynne, 2nd Marquess of Bath, and at least three daughters. Their other children were:

Lady Isabella Thynne 
Lady Mary Thynne
Lady Louisa Thynne (1760–1832), who married Heneage Finch, 4th Earl of Aylesford, and had children
Lady Henrietta Thynne (1762–1813), who married Philip Stanhope, 5th Earl of Chesterfield, and had children
Lady Sophia Thynne (1763–1791), who married George Ashburnham, 3rd Earl of Ashburnham, and had children
George Thynne, 2nd Baron Carteret of Hawnes (1770–1838), who married the Hon. Harriet Courtenay and had no children
John Thynne, 3rd Baron Carteret of Hawnes (1772–1849), who married Mary Anne Master and had no children

After her husband became Marquess of Bath in  1789, the viscountess became a marchioness. She died, aged 90, at Lower Grosvenor Street in London.

References

1825 deaths
Bath
Daughters of English dukes
Wives of knights
Elizabeth
1735 births
Mistresses of the Robes
Court of George III of the United Kingdom
Household of Charlotte of Mecklenburg-Strelitz